Frost is the first novel by Thomas Bernhard, originally published in German in 1963. An English translation by Michael Hofmann was published in 2006.

Plot summary
Strauch, mad painter, isolates himself from the world by retreating to the hamlet of Weng near Schwarzach im Pongau.  His surgeon brother has Strauch watched by his young medical assistant, who narrates the book.  The inn where Strauch resides is managed by a woman with a husband in prison and an endless sequence of lovers. The story includes a significant amount of violence and murder.

Narrative style
The character Strauch has a tendency to speak in long, ranting monologues, which characterises all of Bernhard’s subsequent work.  Another element in Bernhard’s style is repetition: he often repeats phrases with minor variations. As the narrative progresses, the voice of the young narrator increasingly disappears into the voice of Strauch.

References
Bernhardiana, a Critical Anthology of Bernhard's works
"On Thomas Bernhard" by Jason M. Baskin (Boston Review, 2001)
"An Introduction to Thomas Bernhard", by Thomas Cousineau (2001)
The Novels of Thomas Bernhard by J.J. Long (2001)
Frost, a review by Michael Cisco (The Modern World, 2007)

1963 novels
Novels by Thomas Bernhard
Novels set in Austria
1963 debut novels